Bangert may refer to:

 Bangert (surname)
 The original name for Drechterland, an area of the Netherlands
 Bangert, Missouri
 Bangert, North Holland